Pseudotetracha cylindrica is a species of tiger beetle in the subfamily Cicindelinae that was described by William John Macleay in 1863. It is endemic to Australia.

References

Beetles described in 1863
Endemic fauna of Australia
Beetles of Australia